Peckover is a surname. Notable people with the surname include:

Alexander Peckover, 1st Baron Peckover (1830–1919), British Quaker banker, philanthropist and collector of ancient manuscripts
Gerald Peckover (born 1955), Zimbabwean cricketer
Priscilla Hannah Peckover (1833–1931), English Quaker, pacifist and linguist
Richard Peckover (1942–2005), British nuclear physicists

See also 
Peckover House & Garden, is a National Trust property located in North Brink, Wisbech, Cambridgeshire, England.

References